Voivodeship road 449 (abbreviated DW449) is a route in the Polish voivodeship roads network. It connects Syców with Błaszki and national road 12.

Villages and towns along the route 
 Słupia pod Bralinem (S8)
 Syców (DW448)
 Pisarzowice
 Mąkoszyce
 Ligota
 Kobyla Góra
 Bierzów
 Rojów
 Ostrzeszów (DK11)
 Bukownica
 Książenice
 Grabów nad Prosną (DW447, DW450)
 Pataty
 Giżyce
 Ostrów Kaliski
 Brzeziny
 Piegonisko-Pustkowie
 Sobiesęki
 Brończyn
 Błaszki (DK12)

449